USS Buckthorne was a steamer acquired by the Union Navy during the American Civil War. She was used as a fleet tender and dispatch vessel in support of the Union Navy blockade along Confederate coastal waters.

Service in the Navy 

Buckthorn, was a wooden hull, screw steamer, 87 feet in length and outfitted with one mast. She was built in 1863 at East Haddam, Connecticut, as Signal; purchased by Rear Admiral Gregory for the Navy from George W. Jewett for the sum of $26,500 on December 22, 1863; and commissioned at New York City April 7, 1864, acting Volunteer Lieutenant W. Godfrey in Command. Buckthorn was a strongly built vessel and was well adapted for service as a tug. Buckthorn served with the West Gulf Blockading Squadron during the American Civil War and participated in the Battle of Mobile Bay (August 5, 1864). She acted as a tender for the fleet and was also used as a dispatch vessel throughout her career.

Post-Civil War service 

After the Civil War she served at Pensacola Navy Yard until laid up in 1868. After a brief service at Pensacola Buckthorn was sold for $3,000 at Pensacola, Florida, September 7, 1869.

References

Bibliography 

 Url
 Url1

See also 

 Union Navy

Ships of the Union Navy
Steamships of the United States Navy
Tenders of the United States Navy
American Civil War auxiliary ships of the United States
Ships built in Connecticut
1863 ships